

Buildings and structures

Buildings
 about 1170 – Airavatesvara Temple completed in Darasuram, India (Chola Empire).
 about 1170 – Galilee Chapel added to Durham Cathedral.
 about 1170–1180 – Construction of St. Faith's Church, Sélestat, Alsace.
 1170 – San Nicola Bell Tower, Pisa, Italy.
 1171 – Romanesque building of the Tournai Cathedral, Hainaut consecrated.
 1171 – Rebuilding of Canterbury Cathedral began under William of Sens.
 1171 – Pont d'Avignon begun.
 about 1171 – Castle of Almourol in the Tagus, Portugal, built.
 1172 – Nur Al-Din Mosque completed in Hama, Syria.
 1172 – Newcastle Castle in Northern England is rebuilt in stone.
 1172 – Ikorta church built in Georgia.
 1173 – Bell Tower of the Basilica di San Zeno completed in Verona, Italy.
 1173 – Approximate traditional completion date of Great Mosque of al-Nuri (Mosul).
 1173–1178 – First stage of work on campanile of Pisa cathedral in Italy, which becomes the Leaning Tower of Pisa.
 1174 – Monreale Cathedral begun.
 1175 – Sainte-Trinité Abbey Church in Lessay begun.
 1175 – Soissons Cathedral begun.
 1175–1176 – Wells Cathedral begun.
 1177 – The Piazza San Marco in Venice assumes its current shape.
 1177 – Maria Laach Abbey in the Holy Roman Empire completed.
 Basilica Sant'Ambrogio, Milan begun.

References

12th-century architecture
1170s works